Canadian plays have been written since the 19th century, both in English and in French. The present list comprises plays in English, some of which being translations from French Canadian plays. Full length and one act plays are included but not musicals.

The Playwrights Guild of Canada has a large list of titles of copyrighted plays, included in the present one, mostly their own publications or those of Playwrights Canada Press. The year of the playbook in the present list corresponds to the printed form, but when this information is unavailable, it corresponds to the first stage production. In rare cases, neither is available.

In addition to traditional forms, Canada has a vibrant non-traditional theatre scene with notable experimental, fringe, and other alternative forms, the largest fringe festival in North America being the Edmonton International Fringe Festival.

A

The Aberhart Summer by Conni Massing
Abigail, or The Gold Medal by Patrick Young
Abby's Place by Katherine Koller
Abraham Lincoln Goes to the Theatre by Chantal Bilodeau translated by Larry Tremblay
Act of Faith by Janet Munsil
The Acting Principal by Malcolm Shiner
Adam and Eve and After by Maurice Breslow
Adrift by Marcus Youssef
The Adventures of a Black Girl in Search of God by Djanet Sears
The Adventures of the Black Girl in Her Search for God by Lisa Codrington
The Adventures of Freddykid and Seagull Sam by Linda Hutsell-Manning
The Affections of May by Norm Foster
Afrika Solo by Djanet Sears
After Baba's Funeral by Ted Galay
After Marlene by Kevin Arthur Land
After You by Dave Carley
The Aftermath by Lisa Codrington
The Afternoon of the Big Game by Rex Deverell
Agokwe by Waawaate Fobister
Aimee! by Patrick Young
Albertine in Five Times by Michel Tremblay
Alias Godot by Brendan Gall
Alice On Stage by Gordon Pengilly
Alice: The Tea Party by Warren Graves
Alien Creature: A Visitation from Gwendolyn MacEwen by Linda Griffiths
Alien Love Connection by Ken Cameron
Alien Mice by John Lazarus
All Expenses Paid by David Belke
All Fall Down by Wendy Lill
Alli Alli Oh! by Margaret Hollingsworth
Alma Victoria by Margaret Hollingsworth
alterNatives by Drew Hayden Taylor
Amazing Gracie by Warren Graves
American Modern by Joanna McClelland Glass
Ambushed by Karen Wikberg
Amigo's Blue Guitar by Joan MacLeod
And Freedom for All by Ed Schroeter
Androgyne by Betty Jane Wylie
And So It Goes by George F. Walker
Angel by Betty Jane Wylie
Angel Makers by Penn Kemp
Angel Square by Alan R. Davis
Angel's River by Andrea Boyd
The Angelina Project by Frank Canino
Angelique by Lorena Gale
Anger Begets by Tina Silver
An Anglophone is Coming to Dinner by George Rideout
Anna Jameson by Pauline Carey
Anne by Paul Ledoux
Annie Mae's Movement by Yvette Nolan
Anniversary by Carol Shields
Anno Domini by Don Druick
Anomaly by Neil Fleming
Another Country by Guillermo Verdecchia
Another Home Invasion by Joan MacLeod
Another Season's Harvest by Anne Chislett
Another Season's Promise by Anne Chislett
Another Two Hander or Two by David Belke
Aphra by Rose Scollard
Apocalypse by Louis Patrick Leroux translated by Shelley Tepperman and Ellen Warkentin
Apple by Vern Thiessen
Apple Butter by James Reaney
The Apple in the Eye by Margaret Hollingsworth
Apple Tree Road by Daniel R. Lillford
Are You Afraid of Thieves? by Louis-Dominique Lavigne translated by Henry Beissel
Are You Evil Tonight by Daniel R. Lillford
Arianna by Thomas Morgan Jones
Arigato, Tokyo by Daniel MacIvor
Armagideon by Sandra Dempsey
Arnold Had Two Wives by Aviva Ravel
Ars Poetica by Arthur Holden
Art Attack by Kico Gonzalez-Risso
Articles of Faith by Mark Leiren-Young
Art is a Cupboard by Melissa Major
As Loved Our Fathers by Thomas J. Cahill
At My Heart's Core by Robertson Davies
The Attic, the Pearls and Three Fine Girls by Ann-Marie MacDonald
The Audition by Dan Daniels
Audition Piece by Peter Anderson
Augury: Trial, Tribulation and Triumph in the Life of Emily Stowe by Florence Gibson MacDonald
Aunt Hannah Meets Joe River by Laurie Fyffe
A View From The Roof by Dave Carley

B

Babel Rap by John Lazarus
Babe Ruth Comes to Pickle River by Nelles Van Loon
Babies by Ramona Baillie
The Baby Blues by Drew Hayden Taylor
Backstreets by Vittorio Rossi
Back to Beulah by W.O. Mitchell
Back up and Push: Confessions of a Reformed Cynic by Ted Johns
Back to Berlin by Vern Thiessen
Bad Acting Teachers by Sky Gilbert
Balconville by David Fennario
Ballad for a Rumrunner's Daughter by Laurie Fyffe
The Ballad of Weedy Peetstraw by Peter Anderson
Banana Boots by David Fennario
Ban This Show by Sky Gilbert
The Barber of Seville! by Michael O'Brien
Barnboozled: He Won't Come in From the Barn, Part II by Ted Johns
Barnardo Kids! by Janice Wiseman
Basically Good Kids by Mark Leiren-Young
Be Still by Janet Munsil
Bearded Circus Ladies by Jan Derbyshire
Beat the Sunset by Michael MacLennan
BeatDown by Joseph Jomo Pierre
Beautiful Houses by Aviva Ravel
Beautiful Lake Winnipeg by Maureen Hunter
A Beautiful View  by Daniel MacIvor
Becoming Sharp by David Belke
Bed and Breakfast by Mark Crawford
Bedtime Stories by Norm Foster
Bedtimes and Bullies by Dennis Foon
Beginning by Maurice Breslow
Behind the Yellow Door by Flora Stohr-Danziger
Bella Donna by David Copelin
Belonging by Rex Deverell
Be My Friend by Aviva Ravel
Ben and the Boxes by Cherie Thiessen
Benefit of the Doubt by Emil Sher
Benevolence by Morris Panych
The Berlin Blues by Drew Hayden Taylor
Beautiful Lady, Tell Me... by Shirley Barrie
Beautiful City by George F. Walker
Beauty and the Beast by Gail Bowen
Beauty and the Beast by Warren Graves
Belle by Florence GibsonMacDonald
Belle Moral by Ann-Marie MacDonald
Belle-Scene by Florence Gibson MacDonald
Les Belles-soeurs by Michel Tremblay (produced in Scotland as The Guid-Sisters)
Bellies, Knees and Ankles by W. A. Hamilton
Benevolence by Morris Panych
Beowulf by Betty Jane Wylie
Beside Myself by Jennifer Wynne Webber
Berthe by Michel Tremblay
Bete Blanche by Rose Scollard
The Betrothal by Elizabeth Dancoes
Better Living by George F. Walker
Between the Sheets by Jordi Mand
Between Friends by John Spurway
Between Then and Now by Harry Rintoul
Between Yourself and Me by David Belke
Bewitched by Them to Death by Robert Lalonde
Beyond Batoche by Rex Deverell
Beyond Belief by Irene N. Watts
Beyond the End of Your Nose by Julie Salverson and Patricia Henderson
Beyond Escape by Beth McMaster
Bhopal by Rahul Varma
The Bicycle Eater by Larry Tremblay
Big Box by Dave Carley
big face by Marion de Vries
The Big Hit by Hrant Alianak
The Big League by James Durham
The Big Leap by Leo Orenstein
Billy Bishop and The Red Baron by Len Peterson
Billy Bishop Goes to War by John MacLachlan Gray with Eric Peterson
Binti's Journey by Marcia Johnson
The Bird Prince by James DeFelice
The Birds and the Bees by Mark Crawford
Bitter Rose by Catherine Banks
The Black Bonspiel of Wullie Maccrimmon by W.O. Mitchell
Blackpool & Parrish by David Belke
Black Powder (Estevan, 1931) by Rex Deverell
Blade by Yvette Nolan
The Bleeding Heart of Wee John by John Gounod Campbell
Blessings in Disguise by Douglas Beattie
Bless You, Billy Wilder by David Belke
Blind Spot by Meghan Gardiner
Blind Dates by Anna Fuerstenberg
The Blind Hunter by Irene N. Watts
A Blizzard Leaves No Footprints by Irene N. Watts
Blonde Tulips by Donn Short
bloom by Guillermo Verdecchia
The Blue Horse by Peter Anderson
Blueprints from Space by Mark Leiren-Young
Bluffer's Moon by Christine Foster
Blue Light by Mieko Ouchi
The Blues by Hrant Alianak
The Blood is Strong by Lister Sinclair
Blood on the Moon by Pierre Brault
Blood Relations by Sharon Pollock
The Bloody Banquet by Robert Lalonde
Bloody Business by Ian Weir
Blowfish by Vern Thiessen
Blue Dragons by Gordon Armstrong
The Body Image Project by Eleanor Albanese
Body Politic by Nick Green
Boiler Room Suite by Rex Deverell
Bolshevik by David Fennario
The Bone House by Marty Chan
Bonjour, Là, Bonjour by Michel Tremblay
Boiler Room Suite by Rex Deverell
Bone Cage by Catherine Banks
Bongo From the Congo by John MacLachan Gray
The Book of Esther by Leanna Brodie
Boom (Salverson and Fraser play) by Julie Salverson and Patti Fraser
The Bootblack Orator: An Illustrated Lecture From 1886 by Ted Johns
Bootlegger Blues by Drew Hayden Taylor
Borderline by Robert Fothergill
Bordertown Cafe by Kelly Rebar
Born Ready by Joseph Jomo Pierre
Bound: A Study in Justice by Laurent Goulet
Boy in a Cage by Betty Jane Wylie
The Boy in the Treehouse by Drew Hayden Taylor
BOYS by Paul Dunn
Boys, Girls and Other Mythological Creatures by Mark Crawford
Bradley Bradley and the Octopus by Beth McMaster
Brainiac by Daniel Libman
Brandy by Hrant Alianak
Bravado by Norm Foster
Brave Hearts by Harry Rintoul
Bright Blue Future by Sean Harris Oliver
Brothel#9 by Anusree Roy
Brownie Points by Nicolle Trixie Nattrass
Brightest Red to Blue by Graham Percy
Brigid Bonfast: Space Scientist by Shirley Barrie
Brooks! by Rex Deverell
Buffalo Jump by Carol Bolt
Building Jerusalem by Michael Redhill
Bull by the Horns by Peter Anderson
Burglaries In Progress by Laurent Goulet
Burlap Bags by Len Peterson
Burn Gloom: Rituals on Millennium Eve by Elaine Avila
Burnt Remains by Sharplin, Scott
Bushed by Margaret Hollingsworth
Burning Vision by Marie Clements
Buckskin & Chapperos by Paddy Campbell
Bush Fire by Laurie Fyffe
Butler's Marsh by Robert Chafe
The Buz'Gem Blues by Drew Hayden Taylor

C

The Cabbage Patch by Daniel R. Lillford
Cabbagetown Crisis by Beth McMaster
The Cancer Club by Donn Short
Caffé by Bruce McManus
Calenture by Bruce McManus
Calpurnia by Audrey Dwyer
Canadien Content by Mark Leiren-Young
Canadian Gothic by Joanna McClelland Glass
The Canvas Barricade by Donald Jack
Capote at Yadoo by Sky Gilbert
The Captive Moon by Irene N. Watts
Capture Me by Judith Thompson
Cariboo Magi by Lucia Frangione
Carol's Christmas by Kathleen Oliver
Un carré de ciel by Michèle Magny
Carried Away on the Crest of a Wave by David Yee
Carrying the Calf by Shirley Barrie
Cast Iron by Lisa Codrington
Cat's Cradle by Beth McMaster
The Cattle Pen by Douglas Abel
Can You See Me Yet? by Timothy Findley
Cassie by Heldor Schäfer
Cavies by David L. Young
Cecil and Cleopaytra by Daniel Libman
A Celibate Season by Carol Shields
Cesare and Lucrezia Borgia by Robert Lalonde
A Chain of Words by Irene N. Watts
Chagall by Rick McNair
Chairs and Tables by Rachel Wyatt
Champlain by John Murdoch Harper
Chants by Kevin Arthur Land
Chaplin: The Trial of Charles Spencer Chaplin, Esq. by Simon Bradbury
[[Chasin' Broadway Flo]]  by Paul LedouxChasing the Money by Dennis FoonCheatin' Hearts by Paul LedouxCheckin' out by Kelly RebarChester, You Owe My Bird An Apology by John LazarusChew the Blade by Jaan KolkChief Shaking Spear Rides Again by Warren GravesChild by Yvette NolanThe Child by Keith DorlandChildren of the Night by Gabriel EmanuelThe Children of the Night by Paul LedouxChimera by Wendy LillChina Doll by Marjorie ChanChickens by Lucia FrangioneChinook by Paddy CampbellChoke My Heart by Celia McBrideThe Chosen by Rose ScollardChristmas Cards by Beth McMasterInterface by Greg NelsonA Christmas Carol by Jeff PitcherA Christmas Carol by Michael ShamataCipangu: The Tale of Columbus by Richard EppCirco by Pierre BokorCircus Fire by Janet MunsilClimate of the Times by Alf SilverClosing Time by Daniel LibmanClouds of Glory by Betty LambertClue in the Fast Lane by Beverley CooperClue in the Fast Lane by Ann-Marie MacDonaldChoices by Shirley BarrieChristmas by Hrant AlianakA Christmas Carol by Irene N. WattsChronic by Linda GriffithsClosure by Ron BlicqClub Dead by Thom BennettCocktails at Pam's by Stewart LemoineCocktails for Two Hundred by James SaarCold Comfort by Jim GarrardCold Meat Party by Brad FraserThe Colony of Unrequited Dreams by Robert ChafeColour the Flesh the Colour of Dust by Michael CookColours in the Dark by James ReaneyComing Around by Paula WingA Common Man's Guide to Loving Women by Andrew MoodieCommonwealth Games by Margaret HollingsworthCommunion by Daniel MacIvorCompleat Byron by Tom HendryConcord Floral by Jordan TannahillThe Confession by Keith DorlandConflict and Triumph by Elizabeth GagnieurConnie in Egypt by Stewart LemoineContents Under Pressure by David KingContraption by Gordon PengillyConversations with My Neighbour's Pit Bull by Clem MartiniThe Cookie War by Kathleen McDonnellCopper Thunderbird by Marie ClementsCorker by Wendy LillThe Corner of Scarth and Eleventh by Rex DeverellThe Coronation Voyage by Michel Marc BouchardCorpus Delectable by Munroe ScottThe Cost of Living by Morris PanychCote Saint Joe by Daniel LibmanA Cottage Week-end by Malcolm ShinerCounter Offenceby Rahul VarmaCountry Chorale by Raymond StoreyCountry Hearts: A Country and Western Musical by Ted JohnsCouples by David EdneyThe Courier by Vern ThiessenCourting Johanna by Marcia JohnsonThe Courting of Sally Schwartz by Aviva RavelCowboy Boots and a Corsage by Katherine KollerCowboy Island by Brian SheinThe Coyotes by Peter AndersonThe Coyotes' Christmas by Peter AndersonCrabdance by Beverley SimonsCrackpot by Rachel WyattThe Crackwalker by Judith ThompsonCranked by Michael P. NortheyCrash by Pamela Mala SinhaCrater by Sky GilbertCreation by Peter AndersonCreeps by David FreemanCricket and Claudette by Ted JohnsCriminal by Elizabeth DancoesCriminals in Love by George F. WalkerCrippled by Paul David Power A Critical Stranger by Daniel R. LillfordCurator's Park by Benj GallanderThe Curve by Henry BeisselEl Crocodor by Peter AndersonCrossing by C. E. GatchalianCruel Tears by Ken MitchellThe Cuckoo Song by Heldor SchäferCulture Shock by Chris Lorne ElliottCurtsy by Brian DraderCyclone Jack by Carol Bolt

DThe Dada Show by Paul LedouxDamnee Manon, Sacree Sandra by Michel TremblayA Damsel for a Gorilla by Don DruickDance Like A Butterfly by Aviva RavelDancing in the Garden...Like Momma by Elizabeth DancoesDancing in Poppies by Gail Bowen and Ron MarkenDancock's Dance by Guy VanderhaegheD'arcy by Sandra DempseyDark Ages Romance by Benj Gallander and Guy PetzallDark Heart by Daniel R. LillfordDark Rituals by Thom BennettDark Song by Robin FulfordThe Darling Family by Linda GriffithsDavid For Queen by John LazarusA Day at the Beach by John PalmerDead Peasants by Leif Oleson-CormackDead Together by George RideoutDead White Writer on the Floor by Drew Hayden TaylorDear Santa by Norm FosterThe Death of the Donnellys: A Study in Law by Ted JohnsThe Death of Dracula by Warren GravesThe Death of Me by Christine FosterDeath Chart by Beth McMasterDeath of Parent God by Benj GallanderThe Death of René Levesque by David FennarioDeclarations by Jordan TannahillDegrees by Josh MacdonaldDemocracy by John MurrellDemons of the Mind by Talia PuraDenial is a River by Emil SherDepartures and Arrivals by Carol ShieldsDerailed by Emil SherDe Roberval by John Hunter-DuvarThe Dershowitz Protocol by Robert FothergillThe Destruction of Eve by Svetlana ZylinDetaining Mr. Trotsky by Robert FothergillThe Devil's Petition by Munroe ScottDiamond by C. E. GatchalianDim Sum Diaries by Mark Leiren-YoungDinosaur by Rick McNairDiplomacy by Tim CarlsonThe Dirt Eaters by Dennis FoonThe Dishwashers by Morris PanychThe Dissociates by Dorothy DittrichDistrict of Centuries by Sean DixonDiving by Margaret HollingsworthDivinity Bash by Bryden MacDonaldDjuna: What of the Night? by Svetlana ZylinDoc by Sharon PollockDoctor Thomas Neill Cream by David FennarioThe Dollar Woman by Aldan Nowland and Walter LearningDolorsolatio by Sam ScribbleDon Messer's Jubilee by John GrayDonne In by Yvette NolanThe Donnellys by Peter ColleyDon't Fence Me In by Rose ScollardDon't Just Stand There - Jiggle! by Betty Jane WylieDon't Talk to Me of Love by Pauline CareyDon Quixote by Peter AndersonDon Quixote by Colin HeathThe Donnellys by James ReaneyDonut City by Douglas RodgerDo The Baby Last by Rose ScollardDouble Vision by Betty Jane WylieDoukhobors by Paul ThompsonDown Dangerous Passes Road by Michel Marc BouchardDown from Heaven by Colleen WagnerDown for the Weekend by Frank MoherDracula by Talia PuraDracula by Michael ShamataThe Dragon's Pearl by Betty QuanDrag Queens in Outer Space by Sky GilbertDrag Queens on Trial by Sky GilbertDrama in the Classroom by Carol BoltThe Drawer Boy by Michael HealeyDr. Barnardo's Pioneers by Rick McNairThe Dreadful Drofulless by Laurent GouletA Dream Without Bottom by David BelkeDreaming and Duelling by John LazarusThe Dreamland by Raymond StoreyDreamland Saturday Nights by David BelkeDreamspyre by Sara GraefeThe Dressing Gown by Sky GilbertDrift by Rex DeverellDrinking Alone by Norm FosterThe Driving Force by Michel TremblayDropping Ballast by Heldor SchäferThe Drowning Girls by Beth GrahamDrumheller or Dangerous Times by Gordon PengillyDry Lips Oughta Move to Kapuskasing by Tomson HighwayLa Duchesse de Langeais by Michel TremblayThe Dunny by Daniel R. LillfordThe Dunsmoors: a promise kept by Rod LangleyThe Duplex by Jaan Kolk

EThe Early Worm Club by Katherine KollerEarshot by Morris PanychEarth, Fire and Water by Irene N. WattsEasing the Living by Laurent GouletEasy Avenue by Alan R. DavisEasy Money by Mark Leiren-YoungEclipsed by Colleen WagnerThe Ecstasy of Rita Joe by George Rygaeddycandyside by Robin FulfordEd & Ed Do Florida by Jeff PitcherEd & Ed (The Fisherman's Trap) by Jeff PitcherEd & Ed Go to Jail (The Sequel) by Jeff PitcherEd & Ed - Trapped! by Jeff PitcherThe Edible Woman by Dave CarleyEducation is Our Right by Drew Hayden TaylorEgomaniac by Kico Gonzalez-RissoEight Men Speak by members of the Canadian Workers' Theatre(Oscar Ryan, E. Cecil-Smith, Frank Love and Mildred Goldberg)18 Wheels by John GrayEinstein by Gabriel EmanuelEinstein's Gift by Vern ThiessenEldorado Town by Charles HayterThe Electrical Man by Paul LedouxElevator by Cherie ThiessenElizabeth Rex by Timothy FindleyThe Elephant Song by Nicolas BillonElevator by Florence Gibson MacDonaldElisa's Skin by Carole FréchetteThe Elfin Knight by Christine FosterThe Elixir by James DeFeliceElvis & Mavis by Jeff PitcherEmbedded by Louis Patrick Leroux translated by Shelley Tepperman and Ellen WarkentinThe Emotionalists by Sky GilbertThe Emperor's New Threads by Peter AndersonEmphysema (A Love Story) by Janet MunsilEmptygirl by Robert ChafeThe Enamorado by John Hunter-DuvarThe Enchanted Spring by Irene N. WattsEncounter by Aviva RavelThe End by John PalmerThe End of the World Romance by Sean DixonThe Ends of the Earth by Morris PanychEnemy Graces by Sharon StearnsAn Enemy of the People by Betty Jane WylieEnigma by Sandra DempseyEn Pièces Détachées by Michel TremblayEntertainment at the Cafe Terminus by Brian SheinThe Envelope by Vittorio RossiThe Epic of Toad and Heron by Penn KempErnestine Shuswap Gets Her Trout by Tomson HighwayEros at Breakfast by Robertson DaviesEscape Entertainment by Carol BoltEscape From Fantasy Gardens by Mark Leiren-YoungEscape from Happiness by George F. WalkerEsker Mike and His Wife, Agiluk by Herschel HardinEspresso by Lucia FrangioneEssential Conflict by Norma HarrsEsther by Eliza Lanesford CushingEthan Claymore by Norm FosterEvelyn Strange by Stewart LemoineEven Burning by Melissa MajorEver Loving by Margaret HollingsworthEverybody's Business by Yvette NolanEveryone's Death by Robert LalondeEverything But Anchovies by Christine FosterThe Execution by Marie-Claire BlaisThe Executioner by Dan DanielsExile by Archie CrailExit, Pursued by Bard by David BelkeEXITstential by Melissa MajorThe Extroverted Suicide by Cherie ThiessenEye of the Storm by Len PetersonThe Eyes of Heaven by Beverley Cooper

FFables by Jackie TorrensFair Game by Karen WikbergThe Fair Grit by Nicholas Flood DavinDavin, Nicholas Flood. The Fair Grit.http://www.onread.com/book/The-fair-grit-or-The-advantages-of-coalition-microform-a-farce-1044125/The Fairies are Thirsty by Denise BoucherFaithless by Yvette NolanThe Fall by Greg NelsonFall in Paris by Scott BurkeFalling: A Wake by Gary KirkhamFalling Back Home by Sean DixonFalling Out of Place by Sharon StearnsFallout by Rex DeverellA Family Seder by Aviva RavelThe Family Way by Kathleen OliverFamous by Carol BoltThe Faraway Nearby by John MurrellfareWel by Ian RossThe Farm Show by Ted Johns and Paul ThompsonFashion, Power, Guilt and the Charity of Families by Carol ShieldsFather Land by Arthur HoldenFever Dream by Anna FuerstenbergThe Female Consistory of Brockville by Caroli CandidusFerry Terminal by Bo AndersonThe Field by Clem MartiniA Field of Flowers by Laurie Fyffe15 Seconds by François ArchambaultFifteen Miles of Broken Glass by Tom HendryThe Fighting Days by Wendy LillFighting Fear at the Bus Stop by John LazarusThe Fighting Season by Sean Harris OliverThe File by Greg NelsonFinal Decisions/War by Guillermo VerdecchiaThe Final Hour by Dave CarleyFinding Bumble by Carol BoltFinger of Fate by Tom HendryFire by Paul LedouxFire by David S. YoungFire in the Stable by Ed SchroeterFirebird by Rose ScollardThe Firebird: A Saga of Sorcery and Fate by Christine FosterFishing for Frank by Daniel R. LillfordFive Fingers by Robin FulfordFlight of the Living Dog by Greg NelsonFlippin' In by Anne ChislettFlowers by Deborah Porter TaylorFlying to Glory by Sandra DempseyFollow the Leader by Carol LibmanFool's Angel by Kim SelodyA Foolish Boy by Beth GrahamFools and Masters by James DeFeliceFootprints on the Moon by Maureen HunterFor Art's Sake by Colin HeathFor Home and Country by Leanna BrodieFor Love and Money by Rachel WyattThe Fool's Whistle by Christine FosterForever Yours, Marie-Lou by Michel TremblayFor Home and Country by Leanna BrodieFor the Pleasure of Seeing Her Again by Michel TremblayFor This Moment Alone by Marcia KashForget About Tomorrow by Jill DaumFortune and Men's Eyes by John HerbertFortune, My Foe by Robertson Davies400 Kilometres by Drew Hayden TalorThe 40th Birthday Party by Norma HarrsThe Four Lives of Marie by Carole FréchetteThe Foursome by Norm FosterFox of a Thousand Faces by John Gounod CampbellFrancis de Sales by Robert LalondeThe Frank Slide - One Hundred Seconds by Rick McNairFreaky Jane Fine Takes on the Serious World by Jan DerbyshireFrench Chronicles of the 1590s by Robert LalondeFree's Point by Philip AdamsFreeze by Stephen OrlovA Friend is a Friend by Rene AlomaThe Frog Prince by Nelles Van LoonFronteras Americanas by Guillermo VerdecchiaThe Fruit Machine by Brian DraderFull Frontal Diva'' by Donn Short

See also
 List of Canadian playwrights
 Theatre of Canada
 Canadian Stage production history

External links
 Playwrights Guild of Canada list of 2,000 Canadian plays

References

Lists of plays

Canadian literature-related lists